NIAC may refer to:

 NASA Institute for Advanced Concepts, an external NASA program that closed in 2007
 NASA Innovative Advanced Concepts, an internal NASA program that began in 2010
 National Immunisation Advisory Committee, an immunization advisory committee in Ireland
 National Indoor Athletics Centre, an indoor track and field athletics sports venue in Cardiff, Wales
 National Infrastructure Advisory Council, a council of the United States Department of Homeland Security
 National Infrastructure Assurance Council, replaced by the National Infrastructure Advisory Council as of the signing of U.S. Executive Order 13231
 National Iranian American Council, an association of Iranian-Americans
 Nebraska Intercollegiate Athletic Conference or Nebraska-Iowa Athletic Conference, former names of the Great Plains Athletic Conference, American college athletic conference 
 Non-International Armed Conflict, a type of conflict defined in International Humanitarian Law
  Nonprofits Insurance Alliance of California, the first and largest organization in the Nonprofits Insurance Alliance Group
 Northern Ireland Assembly Commission, the corporate body of the Northern Ireland Assembly
 Northern Indiana Athletic Conference, an IHSAA Athletic Conference based in South Bend, Indiana.
 Northern Intercollegiate Athletic Conference, a college athletic conference in North Dakota, Minnesota and Manitoba
 Nuclear Industry Assessment Committee, an organization that shares auditing services among its members